The Minor (or Young ignoramus, Недоросль), is a 1782 play by Denis Fonvizin.

References

1782 plays